Đỗ Bá Tỵ is a general in the People's Army of Vietnam and Vietnamese politician.

Military
Lieutenant General Đỗ Bá Tỵ was the Vietnamese Deputy Minister of Defense when, on 22 December 2010 with "Decision No. 2188 / QD-CTN", Phùng Quang Thanh awarded him the position of chief of the General Staff of the Vietnam People's Army.  On 5 October 2015, President Trương Tấn Sang promoted Đỗ Bá Tỵ to general.

Politics
On 5 October 2015, General Đỗ Bá Tỵ was a member of the 11th Central Committee of the Communist Party of Vietnam.  , Đỗ was the vice-chairman of the National Assembly of the Socialist Republic of Vietnam and president of the Vietnam-China parliamentary group.

References

generals of the People's Army of Vietnam
living people
members of the 11th Central Committee of the Communist Party of Vietnam
members of the National Assembly (Vietnam)
year of birth missing (living people)